Gonzalo Daniel Lemes Rodríguez (born 28 May 1980) is a Uruguayan footballer. He currently plays for Central Español. He played two friendly games for Uruguay.

External links

Profile at tenfieldigital

Uruguayan footballers
Uruguayan expatriate footballers
Uruguay international footballers
Club Atlético River Plate (Montevideo) players
Central Español players
Peñarol players
Expatriate footballers in Venezuela
Association football midfielders
People from Treinta y Tres Department
1980 births
Living people